Pharmaceutical Statistics is a peer-reviewed scientific journal that publishes papers related to pharmaceutical statistics. It is the official journal of Statisticians in the Pharmaceutical Industry and is published by John Wiley & Sons.

Abstracting and indexing
Pharmaceutical Statistics is indexed in the following services:
Current Index to Statistics
MEDLINE
Science Citation Index
Science Citation Index Expanded

External links
http://onlinelibrary.wiley.com/journal/10.1002/(ISSN)1539-1612

Biostatistics journals